Madras Kandaswami Radhakrishnan (20 November 1910 – 29 August 1985), professionally known as M. K. Radha, was an Indian actor who worked mainly in Tamil cinema. He was born in Chennai and took up acting in Tamil stage at the age of 7. He was tutored by his father Kandasamy Mudaliar a famous drama teacher at that time. His career spanned for almost 25 years in Tamil drama as a lead actor during India´s pre-independence days and he was a popular social hero in various patriotic dramas.

Filmography

Personal life 
Radha was married to M. R. Gnanambal, also an actress.

Awards and honours 
In 1973, he received the Padma Shri Award for his contribution to performing arts from President V.V. Giri.

In July 2004, the Indian Postal Service special postal envelope in his memory.

A neighbourhood in Teynampet, Chennai is named M.K. Radha Nagar in his honour.

References 

Tamil male actors
Recipients of the Padma Shri in arts
Male actors from Chennai
1910 births
1985 deaths